Anderson Santamaría Bardales (born 10 January 1992) is a Peruvian professional footballer who plays as a centre-back for Liga MX club Atlas and the Peru national team.

Club career
Santamaría joined Liga MX side Puebla on 20 December 2017.

International career
In May 2018, he was named in Peru's provisional 24 man squad for the 2018 FIFA World Cup in Russia.

Career statistics

International
Statistics accurate as of match played on 9 September 2021

Honours
Atlas
Liga MX: Apertura 2021, Clausura 2022
Campeón de Campeones: 2022

Individual
Liga MX Best XI: Apertura 2021

References

External links

1992 births
Living people
Peruvian footballers
Association football central defenders
Peruvian Primera División players
León de Huánuco footballers
FBC Melgar footballers
Atlas F.C. footballers
Club Puebla players
People from Huánuco Region
Peru international footballers
Peruvian expatriate footballers
Expatriate footballers in Mexico
Peruvian expatriate sportspeople in Mexico
Liga MX players
2018 FIFA World Cup players
2019 Copa América players
2021 Copa América players